Tom and Jerry: Blast Off to Mars is a 2005 American animated science fiction comedy-adventure film starring the cat-and-mouse duo Tom and Jerry. Produced by Warner Bros. Animation and Turner Entertainment Co., it is the second made-for-video Tom and Jerry film.

With both the pre-production and post-production processes being based in the United States, it was animated by Filipino-based Toon City in Manila, Philippines.

The film was released on DVD and VHS on January 18, 2005, and on Blu-ray on October 16, 2012. Alongside Tom and Jerry: The Fast and the Furry (also written and directed by Bill Kopp), the release of the film coincided with the 65th anniversary of the cat-and-mouse team's debut in 1940. It is Joseph Barbera's first solo Tom and Jerry work without his partner William Hanna, who died on March 22, 2001.

Plot
Tom chases Jerry as usual from their house and across town until they arrive at the ISRO, where astronauts Brijesh Tripathi and Vipul Sharma are heading to Mars. In the process, Tom and Jerry are caught during the speech (first misunderstood as aliens due to Tom getting hit by green paint backstage) and the staff try to capture them, but only Tom is caught and thrown out. During the testing of dehydrated food, Jerry knocks over a cup in the process, resulting in the food going all over the place in an explosion. Soon, the staff tries to catch Jerry, but figuring that only Tom can catch him, they bring him back to the base and give him a mission to eliminate Jerry. During the chase, the duo land onto a rocket, ending up at Mars, where Tom and Jerry are left behind. A green female alien named Peep along with an alien dog Ubu and two more martians arrive, to which Jerry is then taken to the martians' lair where he is mistaken for the “Great Gloop”. After much calamity and a discovery that Jerry is not the Great Gloop, Tom, Jerry and Peep hijack a flying saucer (UFO) so that they can get back to Earth and warn everyone about a potential attack by the martians. They manage to stop them, but a gigantic orange vacuum cleaner robot named the “Invince-a-tron” eventually arrives at Earth and begins to suck everyone up with its vacuum. Tom, Jerry and Peep ultimately foil the Invince-a-tron by using a bone to get a Spike into his brain and make it malfunction, destroying it.

In the aftermath, Tom and Jerry are rewarded with a Hummer by the U.S. President (also voiced by Jeff Bennett) for saving Earth from being destroyed by the Invince-a-tron. Before they could even drive it, however, they are attacked once again by a newly repaired Invince-a-tron controlled by Spike, who vows revenge on them for the destruction of his bone. Peep flies back to Earth with the flying saucer and rescues Jerry, but leaves Tom behind to be chased by the Spike-controlled Invince-a-tron. In the epilogue, Biff and Buzz are cleaning the mess as punishment for lying that there is no life on Mars; they soon start to argue and fight about it as a horrified Tom is still being pursued by the Spike-controlled Invince-a-tron into the sunset.

Voice Cast
 Bill Kopp as Tom Cat & Press Guy #1
 Dee Bradley Baker as Jerry Mouse
 Kathryn Fiore as Peep & Press Girl
 Frank Welker as Spike the Bulldog & Ubu
 Jeff Bennett as Dr. Gluckman, Martian Guard #1 & President
 Corey Burton as Martian Scientist, Court Attendant & Eyes At The Gate
 Brad Garrett as Commander Bristle & Martian Guard #3
 Jess Harnell as Buzz Blister, Martian General & Worker #3
 Tom Kenny as Grob, Gardener #1 & Martian Guard #2
 Rob Paulsen as Computer Voice, Worker #1 & Worker #2
 Billy West as Biff Buzzard, King Thingg & Gardener #2

Production 
According to Bill Kopp, the film's director and writer, the film was conceived and scripted in 2003 alongside Tom and Jerry: The Fast and the Furry; the film was announced by Business Wire on November 22, 2004.

Widescreen 
This was the first Tom and Jerry film to be filmed in widescreen and the first one to be filmed in the high-definition format, although the Region 1 DVD and the U.S. version of Boomerang were in full screen (cropping the left and right of the image), though not pan and scan as the camera stays directly in the center of the image. Like television shows filmed in high-definition and other films filmed in high-definition, the monitor the animation team would have worked from would have 16:9 and 4:3 safe areas so that the full screen version would not crop off too much of any important visual elements (such as characters). However, the film is broadcast in widescreen on Cartoon Network in the United States and released in widescreen on the Region A Blu-ray.

Reception 
The film received a negative review from Radio Times, which gave the film a two-star review and said "the characters are drawn a little too sharply, and the running time is just too long for the pacing that made the original shorts so perfect". Screen Rant has listed the film as one of the worst Tom and Jerry movies ever made saying "The plot is fairly convoluted with the journey to and the journey from Mars feeling like they could have been made into two separate films which is likely why it received a lower score". Writing in 2016 in the book "Mars in the Movies: A History", Thomas Miller described it as "utterly pointless".

Internationally, the film was also reviewed poorly. The Norwegian newspaper Dagbladet said that "the first five minutes of this movie, in which Tom & Jerry ravage a regular kitchen, are much better than the trip to Mars with all its consequences". The German film review website MDPress gave the film 6/10, criticising the film's lack of logic even in the context of a children's cartoon.

Conversely, Renee Schonfeld of Common Sense Media gave it a positive review, rating it 3 out of 5 stars and saying "This franchise entry is funnier than some and has a wittier, more well-developed story than most."

Follow-up film 
Tom and Jerry: The Fast and the Furry was released on October 11, 2005.

References

External links 
 

2000s English-language films
2000s buddy comedy films
2000s adventure comedy films
2000s science fiction comedy films
2000s children's comedy films
2000s American animated films
2000s children's animated films
2005 animated films
American direct-to-video films
American adventure comedy films
American children's animated space adventure films
American children's animated science fantasy films
American children's animated comic science fiction films
American robot films
Philippine animated films
Animated films about extraterrestrial life
Animated films about robots
Films directed by Bill Kopp
Films set in the United States
Alien visitations in films
Mars in film
Tom and Jerry films
Warner Bros. Animation animated films
Warner Bros. direct-to-video animated films